{{DISPLAYTITLE:C2H4I2}}
The molecular formula C2H4I2 (molar mass: 281.86 g/mol, exact mass: 281.8402 u) may refer to:

 1,1-Diiodoethane
 1,2-Diiodoethane